Metamora Township may refer to the following places in the United States:

 Metamora Township, Woodford County, Illinois
 Metamora Township, Franklin County, Indiana
 Metamora Township, Michigan

Township name disambiguation pages